The women's 60 metres hurdles event  at the 1995 IAAF World Indoor Championships was held on 11–12 March.

Medalists

Results

Heats
First 3 of each heat (Q) and next 4 fastest (q) qualified for the semifinals.

Semifinals
First 4 of each semifinal qualified directly (Q) for the final.

Final

References

60
60 metres hurdles at the World Athletics Indoor Championships
1995 in women's athletics